Brian Robert Lynch (born June 12, 1978) is an American retired professional basketball player and current coach.

Early life
Lynch was born in Point Pleasant, New Jersey to Mary and Richard Lynch, a retired Belmar, New Jersey police chief. Lynch is of Irish descent. He grew up in Belmar, New Jersey and went to high school at Christian Brothers Academy. He played college basketball at Villanova University, scoring 992 points.

Career
After graduating from Villanova in 2000, Lynch went to Europe to play professionally. There, he spent his first few years as a journeyman playing for numerous teams in different European countries before settling in Belgium in 2004. He last played forward for the Antwerp Diamond Giants of Belgium's Pro Basketball League from 2008 to 2009.

In February 2013, it was reported that Lynch would become the assistant coach of the Antwerp Giants for the next season. In 2014, he signed a 5-year contract with newly formed PBL club Limburg United. On June 6, 2017, Lynch was announced as the head coach for Spirou Charleroi for the 2017–18 PBL season. On November 25, 2018, Lynch was sacked by Spirou.

During the 2018–19 season, Lynch returned to Limburg.

Personal life
Lynch is married to Belgian tennis player Kim Clijsters. They were married in a private low-key ceremony on July 13, 2007 at the Bree city hall by the mayor, with only their parents and siblings present.  On February 27, 2008, she gave birth to the couple's first child, a daughter, Jada. On February 25, 2013, Clijsters announced on her Twitter account that they were expecting a second child.  On 18 September 2013, Clijsters gave birth to their second child, a son, Jack Leon Lynch. In October 2016, she gave birth to their third child, a son, Blake Richard Lynch.

The family divides their time spending autumn in Belgium and summers at their home in Wall Township, New Jersey.

References

External links
https://web.archive.org/web/20090910075216/http://www.sport.be/antwerpgiants/nl/teams/team.html?comp=2465&team=11394&display=2
Eurobasket.com Profile

1978 births
Living people
American emigrants to Belgium
American expatriate basketball people in Belgium
American expatriate basketball people in France
American expatriate basketball people in Germany
American expatriate basketball people in Greece
American expatriate basketball people in Israel
American expatriate basketball people in Italy
American expatriate basketball people in Poland
American men's basketball coaches
American men's basketball players
American people of Irish descent
Antwerp Giants players
Basketball players from New Jersey
Belgian men's basketball players
Bnei Hertzeliya basketball players
Bree BBC players
Christian Brothers Academy (New Jersey) alumni
Giessen 46ers players
Israeli Basketball Premier League players
Panionios B.C. players
Paris Racing Basket players
People from Belmar, New Jersey
People from Wall Township, New Jersey
Scafati Basket players
Shooting guards
Small forwards
Spójnia Stargard players
Sportspeople from Monmouth County, New Jersey
Sportspeople from Point Pleasant, New Jersey
Villanova Wildcats men's basketball players
Limburg United coaches
Spirou Charleroi coaches
American expatriate basketball people in Portugal